"Les Champs-Élysées" is a 1969 song by American-French singer Joe Dassin. It is a French adaptation of "Waterloo Road", written the previous year in English by the British songwriting team of composer Mike Wilsh and lyricist Mike Deighan. While the English version refers to Waterloo Road, London, Dassin's version references the Avenue des Champs-Élysées in Paris.

Composition 

The song was original written as "“Si tu vois ma mére”" 1953 by Sidney Bechet who moved 1950 to Paris. In 1968 its melody was used for the song "Waterloo Road" (lyrics by Michael Anthony Deighan, music by Michael Wilshaw) and released by the British rock band Jason Crest. French lyricist Pierre Delanoë then adapted the lyrics into French.

French release 
The song's French counterpart of "Les Champs-Élysées" was released by Joe Dassin as a single in 1969, with "Le Chemin de papa" on the B-side. 

While "Waterloo Road" enjoyed modest success, "Les Champs-Élysées" entered charts in multiple European countries, with its best performance in Wallonia (Francophone Belgium), rising to No. 4.

Track listing 
7" single (CBS 4281)
 "Les Champs-Élysées" (2:40)
 "Le Chemin de papa" (2:22)

Charts

Adaptations
In the same year (1969) the song was covered by Slovene (then Yugoslav) singer Majda Sepe under the title Šuštarski most (Shoemakers bridge in Ljubljana). This cover was itself later covered by a Slovenian punk cover band Odprava zelenega zmaja.

The melody of Les Champs-Élysées was later used for the television commercial of CJ CheilJedang's dessert brand Petitzel Eclair in 2016, with lyrics sung by I.O.I.

The refrain of the song, accompanied by a yellow bouncing ball over the lyrics, was played during breaks in NBCSN's coverage of the 2018 Tour de France.

The entire song plays under the closing credits of Wes Anderson's film The Darjeeling Limited (2007).

Covered by American punk icons NOFX on their 1997 album So Long and Thanks for All the Shoes

In 2018, the song was remade by Paul Pogba and Benjamin Mendy to honor Chelsea Football Club and France National Football Team star N'Golo Kante. This adaptation achieved great popularity in France during the French team's title run in the 2018 FIFA World Cup, and also among Kante's teammates.

References 

Songs about streets
Songs about Paris
1968 songs
1968 singles
Songs written by Pierre Delanoë